Renegade Ops is a top-down vehicular combat video game with role-playing elements developed by Avalanche Studios and published by Sega. It was released on 13 September 2011 for PlayStation 3 and 14 September 2011 for Xbox 360. The Microsoft Windows version of the game was released on 26 October 2011.

The Steam version of the game includes Gordon Freeman and the buggy he uses in Half-Life 2 as additional bonus characters and vehicle, and the Antlion from the same game as additional special weapon.

Miranda Raison provides the voice of Natasha in the game.

Reception

The game currently holds an 81 and 80 for Xbox 360 and PlayStation 3 on Metacritic, respectively, indicating generally positive reviews.

As of 2011, the game sold over 25,000 copies on Xbox Live Arcade.

References

External links
 Official website

2011 video games
Multidirectional shooters
Avalanche Studios games
PlayStation 3 games
PlayStation Network games
Sega video games
Vehicular combat games
Video games developed in Sweden
Video games featuring female protagonists
Windows games
Xbox 360 Live Arcade games